Yusuke Komiyama (born 22 December 1979), is a Japanese futsal player. Japanese national futsal team.

Clubs 
 2000-2006 FIRE FOX
 2007-2016 Bardral Urayasu

Titles 
 All Japan Futsal Championship (1)
 2008

References

External links
FIFA profile

1979 births
Living people
Japanese men's futsal players
Japanese futsal coaches
Bardral Urayasu players
People from Kanagawa Prefecture